Megachile gothalauniensis is a species of bee in the family Megachilidae. It was described by Pérez in 1902.

References

Gothalauniensis
Insects described in 1902